The 1970 NCAA University Division basketball tournament involved 25 schools playing in single-elimination play to determine the national champion of men's  NCAA Division I college basketball. It began on March 7, 1970, and ended with the championship game on March 21 in College Park, Maryland. A total of 29 games were played, including a third-place game in each region and a national third-place game. This tournament was notable for the number of small schools that reached the Sweet 16, Elite 8, Final 4, and championship Game. Another notable aspect of the tournament was that Marquette became the first team to turn down an announced NCAA Tournament bid for the National Invitation Tournament. Coach Al McGuire took issue with being seeded in the Midwest regional instead of the geographically closer Mideast. They were replaced in the field by Dayton. As a result of this action, the NCAA now forbids its members from playing in other postseason tournaments if offered an NCAA bid.

UCLA, coached by John Wooden, won the national title with an 80–69 victory in the final game over Jacksonville, coached by Joe Williams. Sidney Wicks of UCLA was named the tournament's Most Outstanding Player.

Schedule and venues
The following are the sites that were selected to host each round of the 1970 tournament:

First round
March 7
East Region
 Alumni Hall, Jamaica, New York
 The Palestra, Philadelphia, Pennsylvania
 Jadwin Gymnasium, Princeton, New Jersey
Mideast Region
 University of Dayton Arena, Dayton, Ohio
Midwest Region
 Daniel-Meyer Coliseum, Fort Worth, Texas
West Region
 Smith Fieldhouse, Provo, Utah

Regional semifinals, 3rd-place games, and finals (Sweet Sixteen and Elite Eight)
March 12 and 14
East Regional, Carolina Coliseum, Columbia, South Carolina
Mideast Regional, St. John Arena, Columbus, Ohio
Midwest Regional, Allen Fieldhouse, Lawrence, Kansas
West Regional, Hec Edmundson Pavilion, Seattle, Washington

National semifinals, 3rd-place game, and championship (Final Four and championship)
March 19 and 21
Cole Field House, College Park, Maryland

For the second time in five years, Cole Field House and the University of Maryland, College Park were the hosts of the Final Four. Like the previous time Cole was the Final Four site, all the venues used in the tournament were on-campus venues. To date, this is the last time that this has been the case. The tournament, which featured three East sub-regional sites for the first time, saw four venues used for the first time. In the East Regional,  the tournament came to the state of South Carolina for the first time, with games played in Columbia at the Carolina Coliseum, home of the South Carolina Gamecocks. The East sub-regional had two new sites to go with the Palestra: Alumni Hall, on the campus of St. John's University, and Jadwin Gymnasium on the campus of Princeton University. Jadwin is the only Ivy League venue other than the Palestra to ever host a tournament game. And in the Mideast sub-regional, the University of Dayton Arena hosted games for the first time, starting its tenure as the most-used venue in tournament history.

This would be the last tournament to host five of the arenas: Carolina Coliseum, Daniel-Meyer Coliseum, Hec Edmundson Pavilion, St. John Arena and Smith Fieldhouse.  The Columbia market would not hold another tournament for 49 years, when its replacement, the Colonial Life Arena, which opened in 2002, hosted the 2019 tournament. While the Dallas-Fort Worth metroplex continued to host games, the tournament did not return to Fort Worth itself until 2022 when the new Dickies Arena opened. Seattle has continued to host games, first at the Kingdome and later at KeyArena. The tournament returned to Columbus in 2004 at the Nationwide Arena, and returned in 1972 to Provo and the Smith Fieldhouse's replacement, the Marriott Center.

Teams

Bracket

East region

Mideast region

Midwest region

West region

Final Four

See also
 1970 NCAA College Division basketball tournament
 1970 National Invitation Tournament
 1970 NAIA Division I men's basketball tournament
 1970 National Women's Invitation Tournament

Tournament notes 

 In Iowa's 121-106 win over Notre Dame, the two teams set a tournament record for most combined points (227).
 Every game in the Mideast Regional saw at least one of the two teams score 100 points or more.
 For the second straight year, a first-time tournament participant, in this case Jacksonville, made the national championship game. Niagara and Long Beach State also made their tournament debuts this year, both of whom placed as their respective regional fourth place teams.
 This was the first of eighteen tournament appearances for Long Beach coach Jerry Tarkanian, who would go on to coach the 49ers to four straight tournament appearances, as well as the UNLV Runnin' Rebels to a national championship (1990) and four Final Fours, and Fresno State to two tournament appearances.
 The 1970 tournament is, to date, the most recent tournament appearance for Rice University. They currently hold the fifth longest active drought after Dartmouth (1959), Tennessee Tech (1963), Bowling Green and Columbia (1968) and Seattle (1969).

References

NCAA Division I men's basketball tournament
Ncaa
Basketball in the Dallas–Fort Worth metroplex
NCAA Division I men's basketball tournament
NCAA Division I men's basketball tournament
Basketball competitions in Maryland
Sports in College Park, Maryland